The Western Health and Social Care Trust is a health organisation in Northern Ireland. Hospitals served by the Trust include Altnagelvin Area Hospital, Tyrone and Fermanagh Hospital, Omagh Hospital and Primary Care Complex and the South West Acute Hospital.

History 
The trust was established as the Western Health and Social Services Trust on 1 August 2006, and became operational on 1 April 2007. In September 2021, the trust made an appeal off-duty nurses to return to work to deal with the backlog of clinical cases.

Population
The area covered by Western Health and Social Care Trust has a population of 294,417 residents according to the 2011 Northern Ireland census.

References

External links